This is a list of cases reported in volume 273 of United States Reports, decided by the Supreme Court of the United States in 1927.

Justices of the Supreme Court at the time of volume 273 U.S. 

The Supreme Court is established by Article III, Section 1 of the Constitution of the United States, which says: "The judicial Power of the United States, shall be vested in one supreme Court . . .". The size of the Court is not specified; the Constitution leaves it to Congress to set the number of justices. Under the Judiciary Act of 1789 Congress originally fixed the number of justices at six (one chief justice and five associate justices). Since 1789 Congress has varied the size of the Court from six to seven, nine, ten, and back to nine justices (always including one chief justice).

When the cases in volume 273 were decided the Court comprised the following nine members:

Notable Cases in 273 U.S.

McGrain v. Daugherty
McGrain v. Daugherty, 273 U.S. 135 (1927), was a challenge to Mally Daugherty's contempt conviction and arrest, which happened when he failed to appear before a Senate committee investigating the failure of his brother, Attorney General Harry Daugherty, to investigate the perpetrators of the Teapot Dome Scandal. The Supreme Court upheld his conviction, holding for the first time that under the Constitution, Congress has the power to compel witnesses to appear and provide testimony.

Farrington v. Tokushige
Farrington v. Tokushige, 273 U.S. 284 (1927), was a case in which the Supreme Court struck down the Territory of Hawaii's statute making it illegal for schools to teach foreign languages without a permit, as it violated the due process clause of the Fifth Amendment.

Tumey v. Ohio
In Tumey v. Ohio, 273 U.S. 510 (1927), the Supreme Court struck down an Ohio law that financially rewarded public officials for successfully prosecuting cases related to Prohibition. The Court's decision in this case continues to provide precedent today in many cases involving judicial impartiality.

Nixon v. Herndon
Nixon v. Herndon, 273 U.S. 536 (1927), is a United States Supreme Court decision striking down a 1923 Texas law forbidding blacks from voting in the Texas Democratic Party primary. Due to the limited amount of Republican Party activity in Texas at the time following the suppression of black voting through poll taxes, the Democratic Party primary was essentially the only competitive process and chance to choose candidates for the Senate, House of Representatives and state offices. This case was one of four supported by the National Association for the Advancement of Colored People (NAACP) that challenged the Texas Democratic Party's all-white primary, which was finally prohibited in the Supreme Court ruling Smith v. Allwright in 1944.

Citation style 

Under the Judiciary Act of 1789 the federal court structure at the time comprised District Courts, which had general trial jurisdiction; Circuit Courts, which had mixed trial and appellate (from the US District Courts) jurisdiction; and the United States Supreme Court, which had appellate jurisdiction over the federal District and Circuit courts—and for certain issues over state courts. The Supreme Court also had limited original jurisdiction (i.e., in which cases could be filed directly with the Supreme Court without first having been heard by a lower federal or state court). There were one or more federal District Courts and/or Circuit Courts in each state, territory, or other geographical region.

The Judiciary Act of 1891 created the United States Courts of Appeals and reassigned the jurisdiction of most routine appeals from the district and circuit courts to these appellate courts. The Act created nine new courts that were originally known as the "United States Circuit Courts of Appeals." The new courts had jurisdiction over most appeals of lower court decisions. The Supreme Court could review either legal issues that a court of appeals certified or decisions of court of appeals by writ of certiorari. On January 1, 1912, the effective date of the Judicial Code of 1911, the old Circuit Courts were abolished, with their remaining trial court jurisdiction transferred to the U.S. District Courts.

Bluebook citation style is used for case names, citations, and jurisdictions.
 "# Cir." = United States Court of Appeals
 e.g., "3d Cir." = United States Court of Appeals for the Third Circuit
 e.g.,"D. Mass." = United States District Court for the District of Massachusetts
 "E." = Eastern; "M." = Middle; "N." = Northern; "S." = Southern; "W." = Western
 e.g.,"M.D. Ala." = United States District Court for the Middle District of Alabama
 "Ct. Cl." = United States Court of Claims
 The abbreviation of a state's name alone indicates the highest appellate court in that state's judiciary at the time.
 e.g.,"Pa." = Supreme Court of Pennsylvania
 e.g.,"Me." = Supreme Judicial Court of Maine

List of cases in volume 273 U.S.

Notes and references

External links
  Case reports in volume 273 from Library of Congress
  Case reports in volume 273 from Court Listener
  Case reports in volume 273 from the Caselaw Access Project of Harvard Law School
  Case reports in volume 273 from Google Scholar
  Case reports in volume 273 from Justia
  Case reports in volume 273 from Open Jurist
 Website of the United States Supreme Court
 United States Courts website about the Supreme Court
 National Archives, Records of the Supreme Court of the United States
 American Bar Association, How Does the Supreme Court Work?
 The Supreme Court Historical Society